Roos Hoogeboom (born 16 August 1982) is a Dutch former professional racing cyclist, who rode professionally between 2016 and 2020 – except for 2018 – for the  and  teams.

Major results
2014
 9th Overall Tour de Feminin

See also
 List of 2016 UCI Women's Teams and riders

References

External links
 
 

1982 births
Living people
Dutch female cyclists
Sportspeople from Utrecht (city)
Cyclists from Utrecht (province)
21st-century Dutch women